Joseph C. Irwin (February 13, 1904 – October 31, 1987) was an American Republican Party politician from New Jersey, who served on the Red Bank, New Jersey Borough Council, as a member of the New Jersey General Assembly, and as a member of the Monmouth County, New Jersey Board of Chosen Freeholders. After several decades of public service, residents knew him as "Mr. Monmouth County".

Biography
He was born on February 13, 1904, in Red Bank, New Jersey, to Charles P. Irwin. He was elected to the Red Bank Borough Council in 1934. In 1936, he was elected to the State Assembly, where he served two, one-year terms.

In 1938, Irwin was elected to the Board of Chosen Freeholders; he would serve twelve, three-year terms. Irwin was chosen as Director of the Board for the years 1951 through 1974.

In the Democratic landslide of the 1974 general election, Joseph C. Irwin was defeated for a thirteenth term. He died on October 31, 1987, in Red Bank, New Jersey.

See also
List of Monmouth County Freeholder Directors

References

1987 deaths
1904 births
County commissioners in New Jersey
Republican Party members of the New Jersey General Assembly
People from Red Bank, New Jersey
Politicians from Monmouth County, New Jersey
20th-century American politicians